104 Regiment Royal Artillery is part of the British Army Reserve and has sub-units throughout Wales and the West Midlands of England. It is equipped with the 105mm Light Gun.

History
The regiment was formed as 104 Light Air Defence Regiment Royal Artillery (Volunteers) in 1967. Its units were 210 (Staffordshire) Light Air Defence Battery at Wolverhampton and 211 (South Wales) Light Air Defence Battery at Newport. In 1969, 214 (Worcestershire) Light Air Defence Battery at Malvern joined the regiment. It was renamed 104 Air Defence Regiment Royal Artillery (Volunteers) in 1976. In 1986, 214 Battery was formed at Worcester and 217 (County of Gwent) Air Defence Battery was formed at Cwmbran: both joined the regiment. In 1992 217 Battery was merged into Headquarters Battery and in 1993 the regiment was renamed 104 Regiment Royal Artillery (Volunteers). Meanwhile, 210 Battery moved to 106th (Yeomanry) Regiment Royal Artillery.

Under Army 2020, 266 (Gloucestershire Volunteer Artillery) Battery Royal Artillery joined the regiment from 100th (Yeomanry) Regiment Royal Artillery. In 2017, it converted to a light artillery gun regiment.

Batteries
The current structure is as follows:
Regimental Headquarters, at Raglan Barracks, Newport
211 (South Wales) Battery, in Abertillery
C (Glamorgan Yeomanry) Troop, in Newport
 214 (Worcestershire) Battery, in Worcester
217 (City of Newport) Battery, at Raglan Barracks, Newport
266 (Gloucestershire Volunteer Artillery) Battery, in Bristol
289 Commando Troop, at Royal Citadel, Plymouth (Paired with 29th Commando Regiment Royal Artillery)

References

Bibliography
 Litchfield, Norman E H, 1992. The Territorial Artillery 1908-1988, The Sherwood Press, Nottingham.

External links
Official site

Royal Artillery regiments
Military units and formations in Wales
Military units and formations established in 1967